Koo Ji-won [RR: Gu Ji-won] (born 20 July 1994) is a South Korean-born, Japanese rugby union player who plays as a prop. Koo Ji-Won has lived in Japan since he was 2 years old.

International
After only two Super Rugby appearances for the Sunwolves, which included one start, Koo received his first call-up to his adopted country, Japan's senior squad ahead of the 2017 end-of-year rugby union internationals.

References

External links
 

1994 births
Living people
Mie Honda Heat players
Japan international rugby union players
Rugby union props
South Korean expatriate sportspeople in Japan
South Korean rugby union players
Sunwolves players
Kobelco Kobe Steelers players